Ian Harris is a comedian, director, and mixed martial arts trainer. He owns a Los Angeles-based MMA training center called "Fight Science", named for the unique fighting style that he created. He integrates skepticism and critical thinking into his comedy.

Career

Comedy

In the year 1992, Ian moved to Los Angeles from Santa Cruz, California, with a friend. There they wrote the script Armaghetto, which they unsuccessfully tried to sell. Shortly after his arrival in Los Angeles he was asked, after an audition, to close the show Annex Sunday Night at the comedy club The Ice House. After that he toured the U.S. performing at comedy shows. He often appeared in the comedy club Punch Line. 

In 2000 he moved back to Los Angeles, where he earned a reputation for being brash and irreverent in his comedy. However, in 2006 he stopped doing stand-up comedy and touring, because of his production work and the birth of his daughter in 2005.

In 2011 Harris came back to stand-up comedy, integrating skepticism and critical thinking into his act: "I’m a comedian. That’s what I am at my core." He has made fun of Vaccine controversies, glucose intolerance, politics, religions, and the homeopathic “cold preventer” Airborne.
Six months after his comeback, Harris toured with comedians Jason Relser and Maurice Northup, doing a secular comedy show The Evolution of Comedy Tour.

Harris directed a few comedy specials, including one by Dwayne Perkins, which was bought directly by Netflix. On December 21, 2012, he recorded his own comedy special Ian Harris: Critical & Thinking. Harris' second hour TV special "ExtraOrdinary" was released Dec 12, 2017, by Adam Carolla's Chassy Media and is available on video-on-demand platforms. It was produced with Netflix in mind, but due to policy changes in the company's comedy division they did not pick it up. It was recorded in 2016 at the Rio Theatre in his home town of Santa Cruz (California).

Ian is also a regular contributing writer for US Weekly magazine's Fashion Police.

Harris has performed his comedy act at several atheist and skeptical events:
2017 American Atheists National Conference
2012 Ascent of Atheism Convention in Denver
2013 American Humanist Association National Convention in San Diego
2013 CFI Summit in Tacoma, Washington

In 2014 he hosted a Sunday Assembly in Los Angeles and in 2013 he performed for Atheists United.

Since 2015, Harris has been taking his comedy show to Atlanta's DragonCon, as part of the Skeptrack speaker roster.

In the Summer of 2017, Harris was added as a part-time co-host of Dogma Debate podcast with David Smalley.

Like comedian Bill Maher before him, he enjoys going to socially conservative areas in the united States. “There’s 10-20% that are starving for anything. They’re constantly surrounded by Jesus, nativity scenes, the right-wing propaganda is in full effect, it’s like Fox News year-round. So when he (Maher) goes into town, those 10%, they all buy a ticket. While you go to LA, with 13 million people just like you, they don’t give a shit.”

Comedy achievements

In the year 2001 he was on the Top 100 Comedians list of the Entertainment Business Journal, and he was a semi-finalist in Comedy Central's Laugh Riots Competition. Backstage West called him Top Character Comedian in Town, and he was a finalist in the San Francisco Comedy Competition.

Comedy awards and events:
1995 Finalist Cal State Chico Comedy Competition
1998 Finalist UCSF Comedy Competition
2000 Finalist San Francisco International Comedy Competition
2001 Semi-finalist Comedy Central Laugh Riots Competition
2013 Ventura Comedy Festival

Film

After some years of comedy, Ian wrote and directed his first movie It Burns When I Laugh which won Best Feature Film at the Seattle Underground Film Festival.
This film was presented in festivals, where it had a moderate success, then it was distributed on home video. Ian directed some other movies, short movies and music videos, and in 2013, he began to direct comedy specials for other fellow comedians.

Voice-over

In 2003 Ian began performing voice-overs in a commercial for Universal Orlando Resorts that aired on the Super Bowl of the same year. Since then he has performed voice-over for commercials, television shows, network promos, video games and animation. Clients have included DirecTV, Lays Potato Chips, Full Tilt Poker, Round Table Pizza and the networks Disney XD, Bravo and Fuel. Ian was the narrator for Fuse's Mad Genius, Pepsi/Twitter Live for Now and Scripps Top 3 of Everything. He also does some voice over on Jimmy Kimmel Live.

MMA

Ian began boxing at age six. He wrestled for two and a half years and trained Kenpo Karate, Wing Chun and Japanese Jujutsu for nine years. He also trained from 1992 to 2005 with Richard Bustillo, a Bruce Lee student. With him, Ian trained Jeet Kune Do and Muay Thai. In 1996 he also began to train Brazilian jiu-jitsu with Claudio Franca. He began training other fighters in 2003.
Ian has been featured in Tapout Magazine and Grappling Magazine teaching techniques and was showcased in the book MMA Lessons, a collection of the best MMA techniques from Tapout Magazine.
Ian coined his MMA fighting style Fight Science. In August 2017, Ian, along with three of his former students, opened an MMA training center in Los Angeles. They named it "Fight Science," after the style Ian created.

Critical thinking
Harris has been contributing a comedy essay focusing on critical thinking to the Skeptical Inquirer magazine in 2017-2018 in a column called The Last Laugh.

Awards

Film Awards and Accolades:
Official Selection, 2007 Newport Beach Film Festival
Official Selection, 2007 Del Rey Beach Film Festival
Best Short Nominee, 2007 Swansea Bay Film Festival
Official Selection, 2006 Montreal Just For Laughs Comedy Festival 
Best Feature Film, Seattle Underground Film Festival
Best Director, 2005 48 Hour Film Project, Los Angeles
Best Use of Genre: 2005 48 Hour Film Project, Los Angeles
Official Selection, 2005 Dances with Films Film Festival
Official Selection, 2005 Best of LA Shorts Festival
Audience Choice, 2004 48 Hour Film Project, Los Angeles
Best Music, 2004 48 Hour Film Project, Los Angeles
Finalist, 2003 Fade-In Magazine Short Film Awards
Best Film, 2003 Zephyr Short Film Festival, Los Angeles
Audience Choice Award, 2002 Colfax Film Festival
Official Selection, 2003 Cal State Fullerton Call to Arts Festival

Filmography

Director
 "Dwayne Perkins: Take Note" (2016) hour comedy special
"Ty Barnett: Issues" (2013) hour comedy special
"Bryan Kellen: Ballet Komedico" (2013) Hour Comedy Special
“Pashittu” Short Film (2006)
“The Cult” Television Pilot (2006)
“Booking Tacoma” Feature Film (2004)
“It Burns When I Laugh” Feature Film (2003)
“Silver Patriot: The Final Chapter” Short Film (2005)
“The Paul Decca Story” Short Film (2004)
“Ring Tone Blues” Short Film (2004) 
“Dual” Short Film (2002)
“A.P.U. Art, Pot & Underwear” Short Film (2003)

Music videos
“Darkest Days” Good Riddance, 2006 Fat Wreck Chords
“Smoother than You” Danny Hamilton, 2005 Koala Records
“Dance of Shiva” OUTLIE, 2004 Porterhouse Records
“You Burn Me Up” The Haywoods, 2000 Wormtone Records

Personal life

Ian was born and grew up in Santa Cruz, California, USA. He attended San Lorenzo Valley High School. He was interested in stand-up comedy, writing short stories, boxing, martial arts and surfing.

“I grew up in the 80s (…) in Santa Cruz, in this kind of hippie counter-culture, with punk rock, which was huge in the Bay area back in the 80s. (…) I’ve been an atheist my own life. My act is kind of punk rocky.”  As a consequence, he tends to attract crowds of a certain age, the same older, white, educated people he meets at secularism conventions. “These are the college professors, not the students. They’re the ones who know who I am and who appreciate what I do. It’s very funny to me that this is the crowd. It’s a hip crowd though!”

Harris believes people within the secular movement should respect the range of political opinions of its members.  “We’re so splintered. Atheism is not a belief, it’s just a lack of belief in God. Everybody gets to atheism in a different way. (…) This guy might be kind of conservative, he may be a “lower taxes” guy. (...) It doesn't mean that he's not an atheist. (we're always straw-manning people in their own community, because they're easy targets. (...) But all they're doing is splintering their own community.”

He lives with his wife Jeaninne and their daughter Bella in Los Angeles, California, USA.

References

External links 
 
 
 Extended Interview from Sensibly Speaking Podcast - December 2017

1971 births
Living people
American male comedians
American male mixed martial artists
21st-century American comedians